Obliwice is a non-operational PKP railway station on the disused PKP rail line 230 in Obliwice (Pomeranian Voivodeship), Poland.

Lines crossing the station

References 
Obliwice article at Polish Stations Database, URL accessed at 18 March 2006

Railway stations in Pomeranian Voivodeship
Disused railway stations in Pomeranian Voivodeship
Lębork County